The 2021–22 SEC women's basketball season began in December 2021, following the start of the 2021–22 NCAA Division I women's basketball season in November. Conference play concluded in February, followed by the 2022 SEC women's basketball tournament at the Bridgestone Arena in Nashville, Tennessee, in March. This is the 40th season since the SEC first sponsored women's sports, including basketball, in the 1982–83 school year.

In August 2021, the SEC announced policies regarding game cancellations related to COVID-19. In the event a team is unable to begin or complete a regular season conference event, due to the unavailability of participants (from COVID-19, injuries or other reasons), that team will forfeit the contest and will be assigned a loss in the conference standings. The opposing team that is ready to play will be credited with a win in the standings. Both teams will be deemed to have played and completed the contest for purpose of the standings. If both teams are unable to compete, both teams shall be deemed to have forfeited the game, with a loss assigned to both teams and applied to the standings.

Pre-season

Pre-season team predictions

Pre-season All-SEC teams

Coaches select eight players
Player in bold is choice for SEC Player of the Year

Head coaches

Note: Stats shown are before the beginning of the season. Overall and SEC records are from time at current school.

Postseason

SEC tournament

 March 2–6 at the Bridgestone Arena in Nashville, Tennessee. Teams are seeded by conference record, with ties broken by record between the tied teams followed by record against the regular-season champion.

NCAA Division I Women's Basketball tournament

 March 16–April 3

Women's National Invitation tournament

 March 16–April 1

References

 
Southeastern Conference women's basketball seasons